Gloria June Schweigerdt [״Tippy״] (June 10, 1934 – July 10, 2014) was an American pitcher who played from  through  in the All-American Girls Professional Baseball League.

Born in Chicago, to Emily (née Hardt) and Gottlieb Schweigerdt, Gloria Schweigerdt started playing sandlot ball with her brother and the boys of her neighborhood at age seven. When she turned fifteen, she went to a league tryout held at Thillens Stadium in Skokie. In 1950, she was assigned to the Chicago Colleens/Springfield Sallies rookie touring teams. She traveled all over the country and posted an 8–7 record while pitching for the Colleens. During the trip, she hurled a no-hitter at the old Yankee Stadium. "No other woman had ever pitched off that mound before me", she recalled in an interview.

Schweigerdt was promoted to the Grand Rapids Chicks in the 1951 season and ended up pitching for the Battle Creek Belles during the midseason. In all, Schweigerdt went 3–4 with a 2.72 earned run average in 14 games.

She recalled winning a pitching duel against Jean Faut of the South Bend Blue Sox in the course of the year. She had her best statistical season in 1952 with Battle Creek, when she compiled a 10–10 record and a 2.95 ERA. She also set personal bests in strikeouts (44) and innings (180), while tying for fourth in the league for the most games pitched (28).

Personal life
She did not return to the league after marrying in 1953. After divorcing her husband, she raised two children, Gordon and Gloria, while working as a meat cutter for a long time before retiring in 1996.

Last years/death
Gloria Schweigerdt lived in Arlington Heights, a suburb of Chicago, and attended AAGPBL Players Association reunions. The association was largely responsible for the opening of Women in Baseball, a permanent display based at the Baseball Hall of Fame and Museum in Cooperstown, New York, which was unveiled in 1988 to honor the entire All-American Girls Professional Baseball League. She died in 2014 in Wauconda, Illinois, at the age of 80.

Career statistics
Pitching

Batting 

Fielding

Sources

1934 births
2014 deaths
All-American Girls Professional Baseball League players
American people of German descent
Baseball players from Chicago
People from Arlington Heights, Illinois
People from Wauconda, Illinois
21st-century American women